South Townsville is a coastal suburb of Townsville in the City of Townsville, Queensland, Australia.

Geography 
South Townsville is located on the northern end of Ross Island, bounded by the Coral Sea to the north, Ross Creek to the west and the Ross River to the east. The suburb of Railway Estate occupies the southern part of the island.

Predominantly residential, it also is an important commercial and industrial hub of the city. The suburb is also a continuation to the Townsville CBD, serving as an accommodation and nightlife centre for the locals. The Palmer Street area of the suburb is known locally for its restaurants, hotels and its atmosphere. The suburb is also home to both the Port of Townsville and formerly Queensland Rail's North Rail Yards which have been redeveloped into the Queensland Country Bank Stadium.

History
Ross Island State School opened on 26 February 1884. In 1936 it became Townsville South State School.

Heritage listings
South Townsville has a number of heritage-listed sites, including:
 266 Boundary Street: Victoria Park Hotel
 30-34 Macrossan Street: St John's Anglican Church

Education 

Townsville South State School is a government primary (Prep-6) school for boys and girls at 78 Tully Street. In 2018, the school had an enrolment of 126 students with 13 teachers (9 full-time equivalent) and 9 non-teaching staff (5 full-time equivalent).

There are no secondary schools in South Townsville. The nearest government secondary school is Townsville State High School in neighbouring Railway Estate to the south-west.

Amenities 
The Civic Theatre hosts many national and international artists in the fields of dance, music, opera, comedy and drama.

References

External links 

 

Suburbs of Townsville